József Dóra (born 7 May 1941) is a Hungarian diver. He competed at the 1960 Summer Olympics and the 1964 Summer Olympics.

References

External links
 

1941 births
Living people
Hungarian male divers
Olympic divers of Hungary
Divers at the 1960 Summer Olympics
Divers at the 1964 Summer Olympics
Divers from Budapest
Sportspeople from Budapest